Finland Air Force Station is a closed United States Air Force General Surveillance Radar station. It was closed in 1980.

In 1950 Air Defense Command selected Finland, Minnesota site as one of twenty-eight radar stations built as part of the second segment of the permanent radar surveillance network. Prompted by the start of the Korean War, on July 11, 1950, the Secretary of the Air Force asked the Secretary of Defense for approval to expedite construction of the second segment of the permanent network. Receiving the Defense Secretary's approval on July 21, the Air Force directed the Corps of Engineers to proceed with construction.

History
Finland Air Force Station began as a “Lashup-Permanent” radar site (LP-69) with the 756th Aircraft Control and Warning Squadron operating an AN/CPS-5 radar at the station on 30 Nov 1951, and initially the station functioned as a Ground-control intercept (GCI) and warning station.  As a GCI station, the squadron's role was to guide interceptor aircraft toward unidentified intruders picked up on the unit's radar scopes.   On 1 May 1951 the station joined the "permanent" ADC network operating AN/FPS-3 and AN/FPS-5 radars. By 1959 these radars had been replaced with AN/FPS-20 and AN/FPS-6 sets, and a second height-finder radar (AN/FPS-6A) was being installed.

During 1959 Finland AFS joined the Semi Automatic Ground Environment (SAGE) system, initially feeding data to DC-10 at Duluth AFS, Minnesota. After joining, the squadron was re-designated as the 756th Radar Squadron (SAGE) on 15 December 1959.  The radar squadron provided information 24/7 the SAGE Direction Center where it was analyzed to determine range, direction altitude speed and whether or not aircraft were friendly or hostile.

In 1961 the search radar was upgraded and redesignated as an AN/FPS-64. In 1963 the height-finder radars were replaced by AN/FPS-26A and AN/FPS-90 sets, and on 31 July 1963, the site was redesignated as NORAD ID Z-69.  In 1964 the AN/FPS-64 was replaced by an AN/FPS-27. The AN/FPS-90 height-finder radar was decommissioned in 1970.

In addition to the main facility, Calumet operated the following AN/FPS-18 Gap Filler sites:
 Upson, WI     (P-69B) 
 Askov, MN     (P-69C) 
 Aurora, MN    (P-69D) 

Over the years, the equipment at the station was upgraded or modified to improve the efficiency and accuracy of the information gathered by the radars.  Finland came under Tactical Air Command jurisdiction in October 1979 with the inactivation of Aerospace Defense Command and the formation of ADTAC. The 756th Radar Squadron was inactivated 15 Aug 1980. The Ground/Air Task Oriented Radar (GATR) site was retained until the Joint Surveillance System (JSS) switchover in 1984.

Today the radar station is largely abandoned. The former Air Force Housing area was in use as single-family housing, but is now also mostly abandoned.

Air Force units and assignments

Units
 Constituted as the 756th Aircraft Control and Warning Squadron on 14 November 1950
 Activated on 27 November 1950
 Redesignated as 756th Radar Squadron (SAGE) on 15 December 1959
 Redesignated as 756th Radar Squadron on 1 February 1974
 Inactivated on 15 June 1980

Assignments:
 543d Aircraft Control and Warning Group, 1 January 1951
 31st Air Division, 6 February 1952
 37th Air Division, 1 July 1959
 30th Air Division, 1 April 1959
 Duluth Air Defense Sector, 1 July 1959
 29th Air Division, 1 April 1966
 34th Air Division, 15 September 1969
 23d Air Division, 19 November 1969 – 15 June 1980

See also
 List of United States Air Force aircraft control and warning squadrons
 United States general surveillance radar stations

References

 Cornett, Lloyd H. and Johnson, Mildred W., A Handbook of Aerospace Defense Organization  1946–1980,  Office of History, Aerospace Defense Center, Peterson AFB, CO (1980).
 Winkler, David F. & Webster, Julie L., Searching the Skies, The Legacy of the United States Cold War Defense Radar Program,  US Army Construction Engineering Research Laboratories, Champaign, IL (1997).
 Information for Finland AFS, MN

Installations of the United States Air Force in Minnesota
Semi-Automatic Ground Environment sites
Aerospace Defense Command military installations
Military installations established in 1950
Military installations closed in 1989
1950 establishments in Minnesota
1989 disestablishments in Minnesota